Ben Koufie (5 June 1932 – 4 July 2016) was a Ghanaian football player, coach, and administrator.

Career

Playing career
Koufie played club football for Cornerstones and Ebusua Dwarfs, and represented the national side from 1957 to 1958.

Coaching career
After retiring as a player, Koufie became a coach of the Ghanaian national side, and managed Zimbabwe from 1988 to 1992.

He led Ghanaian club Asante Kotoko to the Africa Club Championship in 1971, and Great Olympics to the semi-finals a year later. He also coached Ivorian team Africa Sports, and in Ghana with Akosombo Akotex.

Administration career
Koufie was the technical advisor to the Zimbabwe Football Association from 1981 to 1982, technical director of the Botswana Football Association from 1992 to 2001, and president of the Ghana Football Association from 2001 to 2003.

Death
Koufie died on 4 July 2016 at the Korle-Bu Teaching Hospital in Accra from an undisclosed illness. He was 84.

Honours
There have been calls to rename the Cape Coast Sports Stadium after Koufie.

References

1932 births
2016 deaths
Ghanaian footballers
Ghana international footballers
Ghanaian football managers
Ghana national football team managers
Zimbabwe national football team managers
Ghanaian expatriate football managers
Presidents of the Ghana Football Association

Association footballers not categorized by position
Cornerstones F.C. players
Accra Great Olympics F.C. managers
Ghanaian football chairmen and investors